Summernats (a portmanteau of "Summer" and "National"), is an annual car festival held in Canberra, Australia since 1987, except 2021. Summernats, which is usually held at the start of the year, is the best known specialist car enthusiast festival in Australia, and an event which attracts many tourists to Canberra, bringing in excess of $20 million in economic benefit to the ACT economy. It has increasingly been promoted as an event for families.

The Summernats spectator attendance record was set in 2017, with 119,184 attendees. Summernats is held over a four-day period, with many events, with prizes in competitions such as for burnouts, parades of cars around the track, fireworks at night and two outdoor concerts held on Friday and Saturday nights. The festival features many vehicles with airbrushed artwork, and restored and modified cars.

History 
The first Summernats was held on 31 December 1987.

Promotion and partnerships
Between 1987 and 2009, Summernats' promoter and organiser was Chic Henry. Henry sold Summernats in 2009 to a new company called Summernats Pty Ltd. The naming rights sponsor of Summernats is Street Machine magazine, and the presenting sponsor is Rare Spares.

The ACT Government has expressed its strong support of Summernats, praising the significant benefit it brings to Canberra's economy.

The Summernats spectator attendance record was set in 2017 with 119,184 attendees.

Venue
Summernats is held at Exhibition Park in Canberra (EPIC), corner of Flemington Road and Federal Highway, Lyneham. In 2022, during Summernats 34, the burnout pad grandstand was officially named in honour of Summernats founder Chic Henry.

2021 COVID-19 impact 
Summernats 34, which was due to take place in January 2021, is delayed until January 2022 due to EPIC being used by ACT Health as a COVID-19 testing facility until at least the end of November 2021. A new, reduced capacity, 5,000 maximum versus the usual ~100,000 attendance, "Summernats Rev Rock ‘n’ Roll" festival was planned to run over the 5–7 March 2021 Canberra Day long weekend to tide fans of the car festival over. However on 13 January 2021, this new event was also cancelled.

Awards
Many awards are given during the course of the festival.

Grand Champion
The most prestigious award is the "Summernats Grand Champion".
 2022 Jason Mansweto
 2021 NONE
 2020 Todd Sorenson
 2019 Rick Werner
 2018 Grant Connor '67 XR Falcon 'Bad Apple' from Orange, New South Wales 
 2017 Mark Williams 
 2016 John Saad 
 2015 Nathan Borg 
 2014 Henry Parry 
 2013: Mick Fabar from Orange, New South Wales, with a 1967 Ford XR Falcon sedan; 
 2012 Ben Sargent 
 2011 Peter Fitzpatrick 
 2010 Joe Lore
 2009 Darrell Leemhuis
 2008 Rob Godfrey
 2007 Zoltan Bodo from Ngunnawal, Australian Capital Territory, with a 1992 VP series HSV Senator;
 2006 Aaron Fitzpatrick from Australian Capital Territory, with a gold 1969 Datsun 510 sedan.
 2005
 Deby and Gary Myers from Narrandera NSW, in a silver 1966 Ford Mustang coupe; and
Dave Ritchie from Dapto NSW, in a green 1965 Ford Falcon XP Hardtop.
 2004 Drago Ostric
 2003 Mark Course
 2002 Peter Fitzpatrick
 2001 Anthony Fabris
 2000 Shane Burcher
 1999 Peter Fitzpatrick
 1998 Peter Fitzpatrick
 1997 Howard Astill
 1996 Peter Fitzpatrick
 1995 Dennis Laing
 1994 Brian Willis
 1993 Peter Fitzpatrick
 1992 Howard Astill
 1991 Howard Astill
 1990 Rob Beauchamp
 1989 Rob Beauchamp
 1988 Rob Beauchamp

The Grand Champion award was introduced at Summernats 6 - with Peter Fitzpatrick being the first recipient (the first of Peter's six Grand Champion awards). Prior to this the top award was; Top Street Machine Overall.

Miss Summernats

 2005: Tanya Lazarou, from Sydney
 2006: Bree Fenton, 19, from Sydney
 2007: Jenelle Smith, 19, from Canberra
 2010: Hayley Swanson, from Wodonga
 2012: Sabrina Damiano
 2014: Danah Wheatley
 2015: Monique Dognan-Smith
 2016: Amanda Beattie
 2017: Jazmyne Wardell

Show and Shine

The Summernats holds one of Australia's most prestigious Show and Shine events. Vehicles from around the nation use the Summernats to announce their arrival on the Australian scene. There are the following categories:
 Real Street, Street, Elite and Tuff Street
 Top 60 cars, Top 20 cars and Top 10 cars
 Top Judged Elite and Top Judged Street

In addition, there are some awards that are highly coveted amongst the Australian vehicle modifying community:
 Master Craftsman
 High Impact
 Artistic Impression
 People's Choice

Air brushing

Custom Air brushing is also celebrated at the Summernats, where an exhibition occurs in the Meguiar's Pavilion.

Driving events

There is a multitude of awards handed out to entrants in cars, which are in the following categories:
 Burnout Championship and Burnout Masters
 Driving events
 Heads-Up Go to Whoa
 Best Cruiser
 Horsepower Heroes

Horsepower Heroes

In this competition cars are bolted to a device that measures horsepower at the wheel hubs. During the course of the Summernats, many awards in different categories are handed out in the 'Dyno-cell' and power readings of over 3000 hp at the wheels have been registered.

Summernats Horsepower Heroes Results:

9  - 1996 Anthony Fabris VL Walkinshaw 325rwhp

10 - 1997 Matt Bunton HQ 454 Van 372rwph

11 - 1998 Jason Gray HSV GTS 404rwhp

12 - 1999 Jason Gray HSV GTS 486rwhp

13 - 2000 Rob Vickery VS Commodore Ute 527rwhp

14 - 2001 Todd Wilkes Giocattolo 850rwhp

15 - 2002 Rob Vickery VS Commodore Ute 1023rwhp

16 - 2003 Eddy Tassone VH Commodore 1376rwhp

17 - 2004 Brett Waine VH Commodore 1470rwhp

18 - 2005 Eddy Tassone VH Commodore 1259whp

19 - 2006 Craig Munro, TRYHRD VX HSV Clubsport 1262rwhp

20 - 2007 Trick & Mansweto, Ford Capri 940rwhp

21 - 2008 Craig Munro, TRYHRD VX HSV Clubsport 1895rwhp

22 - 2009 Lyle Lemon MRPSI, 1533rwhp

23 - 2010 Adrian Abella, FPV Typhoon 869rwhp

24 - Graham Longhurst, HZ Holden 891rwhp

25 - Jake Edwards, Torana, 1592rwhp

26 - 2013 Jake Edwards, Torana, 1666rwhp

27 - 2014 Michael Daniels, Falcon XR6 Turbo 1131rwhp

28 - 2015 Jake Edwards, 2084rwhp (qualifying)

29 - 2016 Jake Edwards, 1783rwhp

30 - 2017 Jake Edwards, 1663rwhp

31 - 2018 Paul Allen, 1010 hp

32 - 2019 Brenden Medlin, 2483 hp

33 - 2020 Maria Passos, 2202 hp

Controversy
A crash at Summernats 2006 injured a number of people (various sources indicating four, five or six).

Street cruises were stopped after the 2005 Summernats, following crowd control issues, however thanks to the support of the ACT Government and several years of exemplary crowd and entrant behaviour the City Cruise was re-introduced in 2014. The City Cruise is the first driving event at each Summernats and was limited to 300 entrant vehicles, however this was recently raised to 400.
However Summernats spokesman Chic Henry was quoted as saying "The situation could be compared to so many other situations in life where people may have been having a bit too much fun, maybe having a bit too much alcohol."

Sexual harassment of women 
In 2008 and 2011 mobs of men allegedly sexually harassed female patrons. In 2017 the promoters adopted a zero tolerance policy to harassment. The festival has experienced frequent complaints and allegations of sexual harassment and other violence towards women by participants, including having a history of women being shouted at to 'take your top off', and men holding placards that read "tits out for the boys".

In 2008, a mob of up to 400 men was observed by journalists surrounding and harassing women, leading Australian Federal Sex Discrimination Commissioner Elizabeth Broderick to comment that such conduct fosters an environment that may lead to rape. Security staff were described as "powerless" to stop the mob, although event organiser Chic Henry stated that he was happy with the performance of security.

In 2011, another mob was alleged to have occurred.

In 2017, Summernats announced its zero-tolerance approach to sexual harassment.

See also
List of festivals in Australia
Ute Muster
Red CentreNATS

References

External links 
Summernats official site
Chick Henry and his Camaro, "FASTFUN".

Auto shows in Australia
Events in Canberra
Festivals in Australian Capital Territory
Recurring events established in 1987
1987 establishments in Australia
Summer events in Australia
Drag racing events